Robert Micheu (born 8 July 1975) is an Austrian football manager and a former player who played as a midfielder. He is an academy coach with Austria Klagenfurt.

Club career
Since 2017 he was managing team "SC Globasnitz". Further information about the team you find at: www.scglobasnitz.at

External links
 

1975 births
Living people
Austrian footballers
FC Kärnten players
LASK players
FC Linz players
FC Admira Wacker Mödling players
Association football midfielders
Austrian football managers
SK Austria Klagenfurt managers